The Marița is a left tributary of the river Cerna in Romania. It flows into the Cerna near Slătioara.

References

Rivers of Romania
Rivers of Vâlcea County